Aliabad-e Olya (also Romanized as ‘Ālīābād-e ‘Olyā) is a village in Hati Rural District, Hati District, Lali County, Khuzestan Province, Iran. At the 2006 census, its population was 232, in 41 families.

References 

Populated places in Lali County